Thomas Culpeper (c. 1514–1541) was a courtier at Henry VIII's court, executed for adultery with Queen Catherine Howard.

Thomas Culpeper (Culpepper or Colepeper) may also refer to:

Thomas Colepeper (died 1613) (c. 1561–1613), MP for Winchelsea and Rye
Thomas Colepeper (Royalist) (1578–1661), MP for Tewkesbury
Thomas Colepeper, 2nd Baron Colepeper (1635–1689), Governor of Virginia
Thomas Colepeper (colonel) (1637–1708), English colonel
Sir Thomas Culpeper, 3rd Baronet (1656–1723), English MP